Regionalmedien Austria (RMA) is an Austrian media company, that produces free newspapers with local and regional content in all districts of Austria and also operates „meinbezirk.at", the online-platform for numerous company-owned regional newspapers.

Distribution

According to Österreichische Media-Analyse (MA, Austrian Media Analysis) for 2020 the local weekly newspapers under the RMA umbrella reached 3,336,000 readers, or 44.3% of the total national audience.
The Österreichische Auflagenkontrolle (ÖAK, Austrian Circulation Audit) said the RMA overall distribution with partners for the second half of 2020 was 3,374,561 copies.
The Österreichische Webanalyse (ÖWA Plus, Austrian Web Analytics) certifies that the website meinbezirk.at reached 33.6% of the population, which corresponds to a monthly average of 2,212,000 unique users.

Corporate structure

RMA was formed in 2009 as a 50/50 joint venture of the Styria Media Group AG and Moser Holding.
Since March 2017, Georg Doppelhofer and Gerhard Fontan have formed the Management Board of Regionalmedien Austria AG.

The RMA Group consists of RMA AG and the individual state companies.
RMA has 82 offices in Austria, with about 800 regional employees. 
Editorial content and sales are managed at three levels: locally in each district, regionally in each province and nationally throughout Austria. 
Because of this structure advertising can be booked and tailored at the district, state and national levels, which gives flexibility in targeting.

The newspapers in the RMA-group  are free and are distributed to households throughout Austria. 
The papers are entirely funded by advertising revenue.
Gross revenues of RMA in 2019 were €95.4 million.
2019 earnings before interest, taxes and depreciation (EBITDA) were €13.9 million.

Editorial policy

The editors of the newspapers throughout the Regionalmedien Austria are independent. 
The RMA local weekly newspapers and online portals deliver local news from the immediate environment of the reader.
In addition, they report on statewide and Austria-wide news and events.
Articles on topics of interest to all readers are provided under headings such as "Health", "Motor & Mobility", "Business & Career" and "Building & Living".

Media

Regionalmedien Austria AG unites a total of 129 newspapers of the brands bz-Wiener Bezirkszeitung, Bezirksblätter Burgenland, Lower Austria, Salzburg and Tyrol, WOCHE Carinthia and Styria, the cooperation partners Bezirksrundschau Oberösterreich and Regionalzeitungen Vorarlberg, as well as the monthly magazines of Regionalmedien Carinthia and "der Grazer".

Ring Media
129 local editions (marketed nationally), published weekly Wednesday-Friday:

 bz-Wiener Bezirkszeitung with 23 district editions
 Bezirksblätter Burgenland with 6 local Issues
 Bezirksblätter Niederösterreich with 29 local Issues
 Bezirksblätter Salzburg with 7 local Issues
 Bezirksblätter Tirol with 12 local Issues
 WOCHE Kärnten with 12 local Issues
 WOCHE Steiermark with 18 local Issues
 Bezirksrundschau Oberösterreich (partner) with 17 local Issues
 Regionalzeitungen Vorarlberg (partner) with 5 local Issue

Magazines (not included in MA and ÖAK data for total RMA) 
 der Grazer (weekly, Sunday)
 Draustädter, Feldkirchner, Gailtaler, Klagenfurter, Lavanttaler, Spittaler, St. Veiter und Völkermarkter LEBEN (monthly)
Mein Sonntag (monthly)

Digital
Digital Media are:

www.meinbezirk.at
www.grazer.at
www.rmk.at
meinbezirk espresso – Nachrichten zum Swipen (App for Android and iOS)
meinbezirk ePaper (App for Android and iOS)
In addition, RMA Gesundheit provides comprehensive health information with the MINI MED series of events, the magazine Hausarzt, gesund.at and minimed.at.

References

External links
 Online-Portal "meinbezirk.at"
Website of Regionalmedien Austria AG

Mass media companies of Austria
Mass media in Vienna
2009 establishments in Austria
Mass media companies established in 2009